Ramon Schwartz Jr. (May 25, 1925 – June 30, 2017) was an American politician in the state of South Carolina. He served in the South Carolina House of Representatives from 1969 to 1987 as a Democrat. Schwartz was an attorney and lived in Sumter, South Carolina. He served as speaker pro tempore prior to his election to the position of Speaker of the House in 1980, in which he served until his retirement in 1986. He was an alumnus of the University of South Carolina, where he was a member of the Euphradian Society and also the institution's first-ever student body vice president. Additionally, Schwartz is a veteran of World War II. He died in Sumter in 2017 at the age of 92.

References

1925 births
2017 deaths
People from Sumter, South Carolina
University of South Carolina alumni
South Carolina lawyers
Speakers of the South Carolina House of Representatives
Democratic Party members of the South Carolina House of Representatives
Military personnel from South Carolina
20th-century American lawyers